Full Circle: The Moral Force of Unified Science by Edward Haskell is a 1972 book that explores the relationship between science and morality. Haskell argues that science is not simply a tool for gathering knowledge, but also has an important moral dimension. He argues that the most important problems facing humanity today, such as environmental degradation and social injustice, can only be addressed by a comprehensive and integrated approach that takes into account the interconnections between different fields of knowledge.

Haskell's book advocates for a new kind of science, which he calls "Unified Science." This is a holistic approach to science that aims to integrate different fields of knowledge, such as physics, biology, psychology, and sociology, into a single framework. Haskell argues that this approach is necessary to address the complex challenges facing the world today.

According to Haskell, Unified Science is not only an intellectual pursuit, but also has important moral implications. He argues that a truly unified science would lead to a greater appreciation of the interdependence of all life forms and would help promote a more ethical and sustainable approach to human activities. In particular, he argues that such a science would help us to develop a greater sense of empathy and compassion for other living beings.

Overall, "Full Circle: The Moral Force of Unified Science" is a book that argues for the importance of a new kind of science that takes into account the interconnectedness of different fields of knowledge and has important moral implications.

References and external links
 Google Books
 Full Circle: The Moral Force of Unified Science; online version by Don Steehler and Timothy Wilken of the Time-Binding Trust

1972 non-fiction books
Cognitive science literature
English-language books
Integral theory (Ken Wilber)
Philosophy books
Metatheory of science